Wasteland is the fifth studio album by English band Uncle Acid & the Deadbeats. The album was released on 12 September 2018.

Reception

Track listing
All songs written by Kevin Starrs

Personnel
Personnel adapted from liner notes.

Uncle Acid & the Deadbeats
 Kevin Starrs – vocals, guitars, keyboard
 Vaughn Stokes – bassist
 Jon Rice – drums

Technical personnel
 Kevin Starrs – production, additional engineering and "Wall of Trash" mixing
 Geoff Neal – engineering
 Zachary Zajdel – assistant
 Noel Summerville – mastering
 Julian Montague – artwork
 Computarded – collages

References

2018 albums
Uncle Acid & the Deadbeats albums
Rise Above Records albums